Henry John Hayward (11 December 1865–21 August 1945) was a New Zealand theatrical company manager and cinema proprietor. He was born in Wolverhampton, Staffordshire, England on 11 December 1865.

References

1865 births
1945 deaths
People from Wolverhampton
English emigrants to New Zealand